Rafael Villicaña García (born 26 March 1958) is a Mexican politician affiliated with the Party of the Democratic Revolution. He served as Deputy of the LX Legislature of the Mexican Congress representing Michoacán, and previously served as municipal president of Puruándiro.

References

1958 births
Living people
Politicians from Michoacán
Party of the Democratic Revolution politicians
20th-century Mexican politicians
21st-century Mexican politicians
Municipal presidents in Michoacán
Deputies of the LX Legislature of Mexico
Members of the Chamber of Deputies (Mexico) for Michoacán